Yeshiva Gedolah of Bayonne is an Orthodox Jewish yeshiva in Bayonne, New Jersey. Established in 1990, it includes high school, beis medrash, and kollel programs. The school caters to serious students, who dorm on-site. The languages of instruction are English and Yiddish.

Faculty
 Rabbi Yakov Rokach, Rosh Yeshiva
 Rabbi Velvel Finkelstein, Nasi HaYeshiva
 Rabbi Mayer Birnbaum, Mashgiach 
 Rabbi Yaakov Hamburger, tenth grade second seder Maggid Shiur. Author of several books & seforim, including Shaarei Rachamim, an anthology on the Thirteen Attributes of Mercy 
 Rabbi Chananya Hess, Administrator

In March 2013 Rabbi Dovid Magid announced his resignation as rosh yeshiva, effective in 2014, and was succeeded by Rabbi Yaakov Rokach of Toronto.

Rabbi Mayer Birnbaum is noted for his authorship of the Pathway to Prayer series published by Feldheim and ArtScroll.

Alumni
Several Talmudic scholars of note have emerged from the yeshiva. Among the most prominent is Yecheskel Sklar, author of  Toras Haman Ha'agagi, a complex treatise regarding the acceptability of Amalekite conversion. Sklar is especially noted for breaking convention by engaging in pilpulic methodology, as opposed to the more common Brisker method.

References

Ashkenazi Jewish culture in New Jersey
Orthodox yeshivas in New Jersey
Educational institutions established in 1990
Yiddish culture in the United States
Bayonne, New Jersey
1990 establishments in New Jersey